Rafael Bernardo Gayol (born July 13, 1958) is an American drummer. He is best known for his work with singer-songwriter Leonard Cohen, and with such diverse artists as Charlie Sexton, BoDeans, Robbie Robertson, A-ha, Shawn Colvin, Bob Schneider, Tito & Tarantula, Billy Harvey, Robert Rodriguez, Patty Griffin, David Rice, Joe Ely, Kelly Willis, Bruce Robison, Tish Hinojosa, Jon Dee Graham, The Flatlanders, Colin Gilmore, Eliza Gilkyson, Patricia Vonne, Scott Gibson, Tonio K, Bascom Hill, Mason Ruffner, Trish Murphy, Michael Thomas, Maggie Walters and Doll Congress.

Equipment
Gayol plays Drum Workshop drums, Paiste cymbals, Vater drumsticks and brushes and Remo drumheads.

Brief discography
2015 ~ Leonard Cohen ~ Can't Forget ~ A Souvenir of the Grand Tour ~ Columbia/Sony
2014 ~ Leonard Cohen ~ Live In Dublin ~ Columbia/Sony/CD/DVD
2012 ~ Leonard Cohen ~ "Old Ideas" ~ Columbia/Sony
2010 ~ Leonard Cohen ~ Songs From The Road ~ Columbia/Sony/CD/DVD
2010 ~ Bleu Edmondson ~ The Future Ain't What It Used To Be ~ American Saint Records
2010 ~ Scott Gibson ~ Just Keep Drivin ~ Independent
2009 ~ Leonard Cohen ~ Live In London ~ Columbia/Sony/CD/DVD
2008 ~ Leonard Cohen ~ Live In Fredericton ~ Columbia/Sony
2008 ~ Tito and Tarantula ~ Return To The Darkness ~  It Sounds/EMI
2007 ~ Michael Thomas ~ Independent
2006 ~ Bob Schneider ~ The Californian ~ Vanguard
2005 ~ Bascom Hill ~ Maybe / Trish Murphy ~ Girls Get In Free ~ Valley Records / Patricia Vonne ~ Guitars and Castinets 
2004 ~ Bob Schneider ~ I'm Good Now ~ Vanguard / Joe Ely ~ Streets of Sin ~ Rounder / Billy Harvey ~ Pie ~ 
2002 ~ The Flatlanders ~ Now Again ~ New West / Kelly Willis ~ Easy ~ Rykodisc
1999 ~ Kelly Willis ~ What I Deserve ~ Rykodisc / Jon Dee Graham ~ Summerland ~ New West
1998 ~ David Rice ~ Green Electric ~ Columbia
1997 ~ Trish Murphy ~ Crooked Mile / Kacy Crowley ~ Anchorless ~ Atlantic / Jon Dee Graham ~ Escape from Monster Island ~ New West
1995 ~ Charlie Sexton Sextet ~ Under The Wishing Tree ~ MCA
1993 ~ BoDeans ~ Joe Dirt Car ~ Reprise
1992 ~ Sun 60 ~ Epic
1991 ~ BoDeans - Black and White ~ Reprise
1989 ~ A-ha ~ Live In Rio'' ~ Warner/Globo/DVD

External links
 L.A. Times
 The Saga of Rafael Gayol
 Amazon
 AmazonUK
 Official website

1958 births
Living people
Musicians from Mexico City
Male actors from Mexico City
American rock drummers
20th-century American drummers
American male drummers
Tito & Tarantula members
BoDeans members
20th-century American male musicians